Idrissa Dione (born 21 July 1929) is a retired French boxer who was active between 1951 and 1958. In 1955 Dione won the European Boxing Union welterweight title and defended it once before losing it to Emilio Marconi in 1956. He retired in April 1958 due to eye problems.

References

1929 births
Living people
Welterweight boxers
French male boxers
Sportspeople from Brazzaville